Nailao, also known as Beijing yogurt , is a traditional fermented milk drink that is popularly consumed throughout China. The word suannai means "sour milk".

Preparation
Nailao (or suānnǎi) is prepared by heating milk and adding sugar to it. Two types of nuts mixed with raisins and rice wine made from glutinous rice are poured in and thoroughly stirred. A special device called lào tǒng (酪桶) is used during production. A lào tǒng contains a heat chamber in the center, providing the heat needed for cooking. The milk is mixed with rice wine and honey or sugar and is rapidly poured into fifty small bowls. The bowls are then stacked along the inner wall of the yogurt barrel, heated for about thirty minutes, and later cooled.

Serving
Places that sell suānnǎi traditionally serve it in ceramic containers that must be returned to the vendor. However, many vendors now serve suān nǎi in disposable plastic cups.

In 2011, a factory specializing in Beijing-style yogurt was opened in the US.

See also
 List of yogurt-based dishes and beverages

References 

Beijing cuisine
Chinese desserts
Yogurts
Yogurt-based drinks